Manuel Vicente Capasso (born 19 April 1996) is an Argentine professional footballer who plays as a centre-back for Vasco da Gama.

Career
Acassuso were Capasso's opening career club, he joined them in 2013. He was promoted into their senior squad under manager Walter Otta during the 2015 Primera B Metropolitana, marking his professional debut with a late cameo off the substitutes bench against Platense on 17 July. Capasso scored the first goals of his career in November 2016, netting in consecutive league fixtures versus Deportivo Español and Deportivo Riestra. He left Acassuso at the end of 2017–18, having made eighty-nine appearances while scoring five times for the club. On 1 July 2018, Capasso was signed by Primera División side Defensa y Justicia.

After no matches in five months for Defensa y Justicia, Capasso terminated his contract in January 2019 to move to fellow Primera División team Aldosivi. He didn't appear competitively across the next seven months, subsequently leaving on loan in July 2019 to Primera B Nacional's Platense - the opponents of his career debut. He scored goals for them against Estudiantes and Agropecuario in sixteen appearances.

In February 2023, Capasso was transfered to the Brazilian Club Vasco da Gama.

Career statistics
.

References

External links

1996 births
Living people
Footballers from Buenos Aires
Argentine people of Italian descent
Argentine footballers
Association football defenders
Primera B Metropolitana players
Primera Nacional players
Campeonato Brasileiro Série A players
Club Atlético Acassuso footballers
Defensa y Justicia footballers
Aldosivi footballers
Club Atlético Platense footballers
Newell's Old Boys footballers
Atlético Tucumán footballers
CR Vasco da Gama players